Lisa McPherson (February 10, 1959 – December 5, 1995) was an American member of the Church of Scientology who died of a pulmonary embolism while under the care of the Church's Flag Service Organization (FSO) in Clearwater, Florida. Following the report by the state medical examiner that indicated that McPherson was a victim of negligent homicide, Scientology was indicted on two felony charges, "abuse and/or neglect of a disabled adult" and "practicing medicine without a license." The charges against Scientology were dropped after the state's medical examiner changed the cause of death from "undetermined" to an "accident" on June 13, 2000. A civil suit brought by McPherson's family against the Church was settled on May 28, 2004.

Background
In 1994, Lisa McPherson, who became a Scientology adherent at age 18, moved from Dallas, Texas, to Clearwater, Florida, with her employer, AMC Publishing, which was at that time owned by Bennetta Slaughter and operated and staffed primarily by Scientologists. During June 1995, the Church of Scientology placed McPherson in an "Introspection Rundown" due to perceived mental instability. McPherson completed the process, and she attested to the state of "Clear" in September.

On November 18, 1995, McPherson was involved in a minor car accident. Paramedics initially left her alone because she was ambulatory, but after she began to remove her clothes, the paramedics decided to take her to the hospital. McPherson remarked to the paramedics that she had taken off her clothes in hopes of obtaining counseling. Hospital staff agreed that she was unharmed, but recommended keeping her overnight for observation. Following intervention by fellow Scientologists, McPherson refused psychiatric observation or admission at the hospital and checked herself out after a short evaluation. Pinellas-Pasco Circuit Judge Frank Quesada concluded:

McPherson was then taken to the Fort Harrison Hotel, also known as the Flag Land Base, where she was put under the care of staffers belonging to the Church's Flag Service Organization (FSO). According to Scientology, McPherson was brought to the Fort Harrison Hotel for "rest and relaxation". However, sworn statements demonstrate that she was brought there for another Introspection Rundown. Mark McGarry, an attorney with the Florida Office of the State Attorney, characterized McPherson's care under the FSO as an "isolation watch":

Scientology accommodated McPherson in a cabana and kept a "24 hours' watch" over her. Detailed logs were kept on her day-to-day care. These logs were handwritten on plain white paper. Most of these logs were kept, but the logs for the last three days were summarized from the originals and the originals were shredded. Brian J. Anderson, the then Commanding Officer of the Church's Office of Special Affairs (OSA) in Clearwater, said in his sworn statement:

McPherson's "care logs" narrate the last seventeen days of her life: she was incoherent and sometimes violent, her nails were cut so she would not scratch herself or the staff, and she bruised her fists and feet while hitting the wall. McPherson was given natural supplements and the drug chloral hydrate to help her sleep. A Church staffer noted that she "looked ill like measles or chicken pox on her face." On repeated occasions, McPherson refused food and protein shakes that the staff offered. On November 26 and 30 and December 3 to 4, Church staff attempted to force feed her, noting that she spat the food out. McPherson was noted to be very weak, not standing up nor on some days moving at all. Scientologists who questioned this handling were told to "butt out".

On December 5, 1995, Church staffers contacted David Minkoff, a Scientologist medical doctor who twice prescribed McPherson Valium and chloral hydrate without examining her. They requested for him to prescribe an antibiotic to McPherson because she seemed to have an infection. Minkoff refused, stating that she should be taken to a hospital and he needed to see her before prescribing anything. They objected, expressing fear that McPherson would be put under psychiatric care. Dr. Janice Johnson, a senior medical officer at the Fort Harrison Hotel who was assigned to care for McPherson, stated that she had been gasping and had labored breathing while en route. However, they passed a total of four hospitals along the way to their ultimate destination.

When they arrived at Minkoff's hospital forty-five minutes north of Clearwater, McPherson exhibited no vital signs. Hospital staff attempted to resuscitate her for twenty minutes before declaring her dead.

Scientologists called McPherson's family to say that she had died of meningitis or a blood clot while at the Fort Harrison Hotel for "rest and relaxation". A suspicious death investigation began the next day and an autopsy was performed. One year later, in response to a Clearwater Police Department website request for information on her death, Clearwater media began speculating about the causes of McPherson's death. Regular pickets have taken place outside Scientology offices on or around the anniversary of her death in the years since.

Coroner's report and review

First coroner's report
On December 5, 1995, McPherson's autopsy was conducted by assistant medical examiner Robert Davis. Davis never completed McPherson's autopsy report because he was asked to resign from his position. The report identified McPherson's cause of death as a thromboembolism of the left pulmonary artery caused by "bed rest and severe dehydration", ruling the manner of death as "undetermined". The report also identified multiple bruises, an abrasion on the nose, lesions and insect bites that appeared consistent with that of a cockroach. The autopsy report was completed by Davis’s supervisor, medical examiner Joan Wood.

On January 21, 1997, Wood appeared on the news program Inside Edition and stated that the autopsy showed McPherson's condition had deteriorated slowly, going without fluids for five to ten days, was underweight, had cockroach bites and was comatose from 24 to 48 hours before she died. Scientology's legal team proceeded to sue Wood to gain access to her files; including tissue, organ and blood samples from McPherson's body. The lawsuit argued that Wood waived any right to keep her records on the case closed when she spoke openly about the case with news reporters. Scientology alleged that the records were needed to start their legal defense. These records were previously denied to the Church because they were part of an ongoing criminal investigation.

Independent opinion
The St. Petersburg Times contacted five medical experts for their opinions about the report, and they confirmed Wood's opinion. Scientology responded that the five doctors should have been given the entire autopsy report, not just the vitreous fluid tests, which pathologists use to determine the composition of blood at the time before death.

Scientology hired forensic pathologists
Scientology hired its own team to oppose Wood's findings, including two nationally known forensic pathologists: Dr. Michael Baden, a former chief medical examiner for New York City; and Dr. Cyril Wecht, a county coroner from Pittsburgh, Pennsylvania. Baden and Wecht concluded that McPherson died suddenly and unpredictably of a blood clot in her left lung that originated from a knee bruise she suffered in the minor car accident seventeen days earlier.

This scientific evidence was then sent to Wood for review. The scientific evidence sent to Wood included:
 Research on compounds known as ketones, which people produce when they are dehydrated, starving or even fasting. Tests of McPherson's bodily fluids showed no ketones according to the pathologists.
 Findings from a body measurement expert hired by the church. The Church-hired expert compared autopsy photos of McPherson with those taken shortly before the accident. The expert concluded from the photographs there was "no appreciable weight loss", countering the prosecution's view that McPherson lost   to  while in Scientology's care.
 A report by a Morton Plant Hospital doctor and Church officials who saw McPherson just before she entered the Fort Harrison Hotel, stating McPherson was already thin with protruding cheek bones.
 A report by Robert D. Davis, the pathologist who conducted the autopsy for Wood's office, concluded McPherson's body was of average nutritional status.
 Medical literature and sworn testimony gathered by the church that it says proves the eye fluid samples were improperly handled by Wood's office, incompetently tested at an independent lab and ultimately contaminated.

The plaintiff's response was that the chain of custody of evidence was not broken (also corroborated by assistant State Attorney Douglas Crow's memo to State Attorney Bernie McCabe).

Due to the vitreous fluid tests, Baden and Wecht maintained that McPherson was dehydrated. Chemical pathologists Calvin Bandt and Werner Spitz concurred with the initial coroner's report in their affidavits. Plaintiff witness Dr. Alan Wu also testified that ketones need not be present for dehydration in a special case like McPherson where she was fed proteins and therefore didn't create measurable ketones.

Final coroner's report
In light of the new scientific evidence provided by Scientology, a review was mandated. The policy stated that the medical examiner will "readdress key issues" in a case if "credible new evidence is presented, regardless of its source." After the review, Wood changed the cause of death from "undetermined" to an "accident." Wood stated that McPherson's psychosis and auto accident were major factors to the development of the fatal pulmonary embolism.

Criminal case review
Wood's revised report caused the review and subsequent dismissal of the criminal case concerning McPherson's death. The review was done by assistant State Attorney Douglas Crow and was outlined in the 31-page memo that he sent to State Attorney Bernie McCabe, with a recommendation to drop the criminal case against Scientology.

The initial autopsy
Crow stated that there were credibility issues with the original autopsy, including that Wood signed the autopsy herself, five months after Davis's departure, she failed to examine tissue samples and did not consult clinical experts before reaching her conclusion. He also pointed out two other mistakes made by Wood, such as, she released the autopsy report on an active-criminal case and went public on national media.

Robert Davis's testimony
Davis changed his testimony from a 1997 deposition given in the civil case to strongly disagree that McPherson was severely dehydrated. He also made a series of accusations against the Medical Examiner Office's handling of the case and questioned its motive. Davis stated that Wood was not present during the autopsy and did not consult him when she signed the autopsy.

Destruction of evidence
Crow noted that Wood's credibility would be attacked due to the Medical Examiner Office's failure to follow its own policies; to preserve evidence, for the release of the body for cremation before a cause of death had been determined, and for the destruction of Davis’s autopsy notes.

Wood's explanation of the autopsy changes
The primary reason Wood gave for changing her findings was her realization that the microscopic slides of the popliteal vein and the photographs of muscle tissue in the surrounding area provided evidence of trauma which could explain the thrombus formation. She could not explain why she had not seen this before. Crow was highly critical of Wood in his memo, stating:

Crow also mentioned a unique set of circumstances that put Wood under tremendous pressure and might have affected the quality of her judgment. These being:
 Wood's appearance on Inside Edition left her more vulnerable to litigation and committed her to a forensic position that would make any modification professionally embarrassing.
 The fact that Davis, the forensic examiner that actually did the autopsy, was critical of her conclusions.
 The defense suggestion that if forced to litigate it would reveal information extremely damaging to Wood's office and her career.

Conclusion
Crow concluded that even though there was probable cause, the actions and testimony of Wood had so muddied the facts that there wasn't enough credible evidence to prove the case beyond reasonable doubt, and recommended the dismissal of all charges.

Timeline
1995
 December 5 - Lisa McPherson died while under the care of Flag Service Organization (FSO), a branch of the Church of Scientology.

1997
 February 19 - McPherson's family sued the Church of Scientology and the individuals involved for wrongful death, while the Church claimed it did nothing wrong toward McPherson.

1998
 September 15 - Dr. David Minkoff settled his portion of the wrongful death suit by having his malpractice insurance pay $100,000 to the estate.
 November 13 - Scientology was indicted on two felony charges in McPherson's death; abuse or neglect of a disabled adult, a second-degree felony, and unauthorized practice of medicine, a third-degree felony; the first criminal charges ever filed in the U.S. against Scientology. These charges were brought against Scientology as a corporation, not against any individuals, and the maximum penalty, had the charges been pursued and the Church found guilty, would have been a $15,000 fine plus costs.

1999
 December 6 - Florida State Attorney Bernie McCabe presented a response to Scientology's attempt to get the case dismissed.

2000
 February 23 - Wood changed McPherson's cause of death of to an "accident". "Gone from the new report is the original reference to the bed rest and dehydration. Wood still traces the death to a blood clot behind McPherson's knee. But she lists McPherson's psychosis and a minor auto accident as major factors."
 March 8 - A group of more than 200 Scientologists moved to have the criminal case dismissed on the claim that it had "chilled the religious rights of every Scientologist" and that other Scientologists were now being treated with concern, suspicion or ridicule by non-Scientologists. A central point of the motion was that McPherson had undergone the Introspection Rundown, which the brief putting forth the motion called an "entirely religious" practice.
 April 4 - Scientology moved to have the entire criminal case dismissed. "The entire basis for the state's prosecution of this case has now collapsed," begins one of the many Scientology legal briefs arguing the case should be dismissed.
 June 12 - On the advice of Assistant State Attorney Douglas Crow, State Attorney Bernie McCabe dropped the criminal charges against the Church. According to a memo by Crow, medical examiner Joan Wood could not be counted on to confidently testify.

2001
 August 3 - Minkoff had his license suspended for one year and was fined $10,000 for prescribing medicine to McPherson at the request of her FSO caretakers without having ever seen her.

2002
 April 29 - Scientology accused McPherson attorney Ken Dandar of professional misconduct and perjury and tried to get him removed from the case.
 June 22 - Pinellas-Pasco Circuit Judge Frank Quesada dismissed the count alleging that McPherson was falsely imprisoned on the McPherson's civil suit.

2003
 August - Scientology sued Dandar for breach of contract, for having added Church leader David Miscavige to the wrongful death lawsuit despite a mutual agreement not to add additional defendants. In a 2003 jury trial, Scientology asked for over $2 million in damages, but received only $4,500 in attorney fees and no punitive damages.

2004
 May 28 - Under terms undisclosed to the public, the civil suit was settled out of court.

2009
 June 22 - Mark Rathbun, a former member of Scientology, admitted that he had instructed the Church to destroy files related to the case.

2012
 October 31 - Dandar filed a federal lawsuit against Scientology and its attorneys, asking for injunctive relief from the church's litigation, which he claimed was a violation of his civil rights.
 November 17 - In support of Dandar's lawsuit, Rathbun claimed in sworn testimony that Scientology spent $30 million to influence Florida judges and defame Dandar during the criminal and civil lawsuits concerning McPherson's death. Rathbun also claimed that Scientology influenced Wood's ruling of McPherson's death as "accident" by bribing her lawyer, Jeffrey Goodis, with Super Bowl tickets and other gifts. Goodis denied the charges.
 November 24 - Dandar added Miscavige as a defendant in his federal lawsuit against Scientology.
 November 28 - Mat Pesch, the former treasury secretary of the FSO, claimed that he witnessed the OSA dumping $20 million in FSO reserves into Scientology's legal defense over McPherson's death.

Legacy

Lisa McPherson Clause
As a result of the controversy surrounding McPherson's death, the Church of Scientology now requires members to sign a general release form each time they register for a new service, whereby they make certain agreements, such as acknowledging that Scientology is a religion and not intended to treat medical issues, promising not to sue the Church for any reason unless criminal negligence is assured, or disavowing psychiatric treatment. In the event a Scientologist is involuntarily placed into a psychiatric ward or institution, the form also grants permission to allow the Church to intervene on their behalf and have them released into the care of other Scientologists in order to undergo the Introspection Rundown or any other Scientology services deemed necessary.

Injunction against the film The Profit
During the civil suit against Scientology brought by McPherson's family members, an injunction was sought and obtained to keep the Scientology-critical film The Profit from being shown to avoid prejudicing the jury pool against Scientology.

See also

Project Chanology – worldwide protests held against Scientology on February 10, 2008, Lisa McPherson's birthday
Death of Kaja Ballo
Lisa McPherson Trust – a now-defunct protest organization named after McPherson
Murder of Elli Perkins – a senior auditor at the Church of Scientology in Buffalo, New York, murdered by her schizophrenic son, Jeremy, on March 13, 2003
Scientology and psychiatry

References

External links
Lisa McPherson Memorial website Created by critic of Scientology, Jeff Jacobsen

1959 births
1995 deaths
American Scientologists
Deaths by person in Florida
Deaths from pulmonary embolism
People from Dallas
Scientology-related controversies